Ervin Dér (born 11 January 1956) is a Hungarian former cyclist. He competed in the team pursuit event at the 1980 Summer Olympics.

References

External links
 

1956 births
Living people
Hungarian male cyclists
Olympic cyclists of Hungary
Cyclists at the 1980 Summer Olympics
People from Orosháza
Sportspeople from Békés County